Schwarzsee is a lake at Laret, between Davos and Klosters in the Grisons, Switzerland. It is located at an elevation of 1504 m.

Lakes of Switzerland
Lakes of Graubünden
Davos
Klosters-Serneus